This is a list of diplomatic missions of Namibia. The sparsely populated, but comparatively affluent, the southern African nation of Namibia has a modest number of diplomatic missions abroad.

Africa

Americas

Asia

Europe

Multilateral organisations

Gallery

See also
 Foreign relations of Namibia
 List of diplomatic missions in Namibia
 Visa policy of Namibia

Notes

References

 Ministry of Foreign Affairs of Namibia

Diplomatic missions
Namibia